Dasymetopa luteipennis is a species of ulidiid or picture-winged fly in the genus Dasymetopa of the family Ulidiidae.

References

luteipennis